Rue du Chat-qui-Pêche is considered the narrowest street in Paris.

It is in the 5th arrondissement, on the Rive Gauche of the Seine, and runs from Quai Saint-Michel to Rue de la Huchette,

History

Built in 1540, it then ended on the bank of the river Seine.

The status of "narrowest" street in Paris is also conferred on the sentier des Merisiers in the 12th arrondissement and the passage de la Duée in the 20e arrondissement.

Origin of the name
In English the name means "Street of the Fishing Cat". It was named after the picture on a shop sign.

The original name was Rue des Étuves, and at various times it has also been known as Rue du Renard (not to be confused with the current Rue du Renard, in the 4e arr.) and Rue des Bouticles.

Literature
Jolán Földes, a Hungarian author, lived on this street in 1930, and gave its name to one of her novels: A halászó macska uccája, which is the literal translation of the name in Hungarian.

Access

See also
 Mårten Trotzigs Gränd

References